Lillehammer Art Museum is an art gallery located in Lillehammer, Norway.

The museum was founded in 1921 as a gift from merchant Einar Lunde. It has three main collections: one consisting of over 100 paintings from adherents of the Matisse school, donated by Einar Lunde from the 1920s. In 1958, antique dealer   Oscar Johannesen donated his entire collection from the 19th century. In 2008, Jon Dobloug donated major parts of his collection including 159 paintings dating from the 1980s and 1990s.

The older part of the collection, pictures donated by Lunde and Johannessen,  is mainly found in the building designed by architect Erling Viksjø, which was completed in 1963. The newer building (Flygelet) was designed by the architecture firm Snøhetta and opened to the public in 1992. During the 1994 Winter Olympics, this building served  as the main venue for cultural activities.

References

External links
 Lillehammer kunstmuseum website

Art museums and galleries in Norway
Buildings and structures in Lillehammer
Museums in Innlandet
Venues of the 1994 Winter Olympics
Venues of the 2016 Winter Youth Olympics